Texture (previously known as Next Issue) was a digital magazine app launched in 2012. The service had a monthly subscription fee that gave readers access to over 200 magazines. The service was established by Next Issue Media, a joint-venture between Condé Nast, Hearst Magazines, Meredith Corporation, News Corp, Rogers Media, and Time Inc. Reading apps were available on iOS, Android and Kindle Fire HD. Rogers Communications brought the service to Canada in late 2013. The following year, a French version of the app was launched.

In December 2014, Next Issue Media secured $50 million in financing from Kohlberg Kravis Roberts.

Next Issue rebranded itself as Texture and relaunched in September 2015. That same year, Texture paid out $15 million in subscription revenue to publishers.

On March 12, 2018, Apple Inc. announced it had signed an agreement to acquire Texture for an undisclosed sum. In March 2019, Apple announced a new subscription offering within its Apple News application, Apple News+, which offers a similar service. Texture was shut down on May 28, 2019, in favor of Apple News+; unlike Texture, Apple News+ is available only on Apple iOS and macOS devices, no longer supporting Android.

References 

Internet properties established in 2012
American companies established in 2010
IOS software
Android (operating system) software
Universal Windows Platform apps
Apple Inc. acquisitions
Apple Inc. subsidiaries
Apple Inc. services
Defunct subscription services
2018 mergers and acquisitions
Internet properties disestablished in 2019